Canoe Lake is a lake in geographic Scarfe Township in Algoma District, Ontario, Canada, about  north of the community of Blind River. The lake is shaped like a compressed letter "Z" with the horizontal strokes of the "Z" aligned northwest to southeast. The primary inflow and outflow is the Blind River, which leads into Lake Huron. The outflow point is a small hydroelectric dam.

There is a second Canoe Lake in Algoma District further east, Canoe Lake (The North Shore), part of the Serpent River system.

See also
List of lakes in Ontario

References

Lakes of Algoma District